Great Detectives of Old Time Radio Live is an Australian touring show that debuted in 2015. The show's plot centred around recreating the experience of attending a 1950s radio drama recording. The show drew heavily on elements from the 1950s "the golden age of radio drama." The original show featured three original stories, the touring edition also featured three, but eventually eliminated the finale story. The show is notable for featuring minimal audience interaction and the actors are able to "break," as the cast are playing actors playing characters - so they are aware of the audiences' presence. The show was adapted, directed and produced by Benjamin Maio Mackay.

Original Adelaide Fringe 2015
The original production was performed in the Adelaide Fringe Festival 2015 and premiered at the Capri Theatre. The show featured Benjamin Maio Mackay, Michael Allen, Julia Sciacca, Eden Trebilco , Therese Hornby, Jennifer Barry (actor), and Brian Knott.

The show was set in the 1950s and the line up of shows included Dragnet, Yours Truly Johnny Dollar and Candy Matson. Maio Mackay, Trebilco and Sciacca played the leads in each respectively.

Revised Touring Production 2016/2017
In 2016 the show was revived by  Preachrs Podcast OnLine & OnStage and this new version toured Australia.

The revised show featured two Candy Matson stories and one Johnny Dollar story. The cast was reduced to  Benjamin Maio Mackay, Julia Sciacca, Eden Trebilco, and Jennifer Barry (actor). The show was again adapted and directed by Benjamin Maio Mackay. It opened in September 2016 in the Sydney Fringe.

Critical reaction
The show received a number of 2016 Broadway World Award Theatre Nominations, including; Best Actor (Maio Mackay and Trebilco), Best Actress (Sciacca), Best Supporting Actress (Barry), Best Director (Maio Mackay), and Best Play.

“There’s something utterly charming about the radio plays of the 1950s, and this production captures that charm perfectly...Close your eyes and you’re back in the 1950s listening avidly as the latest instalment spirals out of the wireless!” 4 Stars - The Adelaide Advertiser 

“Great experience. An opportunity that doesn’t come along often – a trip back in time to the sounds of yesteryear.” - Radio Adelaide 

“If you have a hankering to revisit the entertainment of another era, this is an excellent way to do it.” 4 Stars - Rip it Up 

“A fabulous show” - The Clothesline 

"This was an enjoyable performance that improved with each story and entertained the audience. Thanks to the direction and it took us back to a time when entertainment consisted of well-scripted plots, vocal talent, and minimal sound effects—even those who had never experienced authentic radio drama were enthralled by the talent on stage and engaging stories." Highly Recommended Show - Fringe Review UK 

"It was a lovely way to spend 85 minutes." - Yaniism 

"The show is well thought-out and put together and provides an entertaining experience for the audience." - Adelaide Theatre Guide

Seasons
 The 2015 Adelaide Fringe Festival
 2016 Sydney Fringe
 2016 Adelaide Season
 2016 Mount Gambier Season
 2017 Adelaide Fringe Return Season
2018 Adelaide Fringe Return Season

Guest Stars
The 2016/2017 version features a guest star in every performance. They have 6 lines across the play, but remain onstage the entire show. A variety of media personalities, musical theatre performers and TV stars have taken on the role. No guest stars appeared in Mount Gambier or in the 2018 production.

 Andrew Hansen, Sydney 2016
 Kurt Phelan, Sydney 2016
 Veronica Milsom, Sydney 2016
 Adam Richard, Sydney 2016
 Stephen Mahy, Sydney 2016
 Mark Humphries, Sydney 2016
 David Gauci, Adelaide 2016
 Graeme Goodings, Adelaide 2016
 Markus Hamence, Adelaide 2016
 Sean Braithwaite, Adelaide 2016
 Mark Oates, Adelaide 2016
 Simon Taylor, Adelaide 2017
 Rob Lloyd, Adelaide 2017
 Peter Combe, Adelaide 2017

References

2015 radio dramas